Don Fowler may refer to:

 Donald Fowler (1935–2020), National Chairman of the Democratic National Committee
 Don Paul Fowler (1953–1999), English classicist
 Don D. Fowler, anthropologist and archaeologist